Theresia is the usual Dutch and German form of the name Teresa, and may refer to:

 Theresia of Dietrichstein (1768–1822), German countess and noted beauty
 Edith Stein (1891–1942), also known as St. Teresa Benedicta of the Cross, German Jewish philosopher, Roman Catholic nun, martyr and saint
 Theresia Degener (born 1961), German jurist and professor of law
 Theresia Gouw (born 1968), American entrepreneur and venture capital investor
Theresia Haidlmayr (born 1955), Austrian politician
 Theresia Kiesl (born 1963), Austrian retired middle distance runner
 Theresia van der Pant (1924–2013), Dutch sculptor
 Theresia Singer, opera singer

Feminine given names
Dutch feminine given names
German feminine given names